Mamyakovo (Mämäk) is a rural locality (a village) in Sharipovsky Selsoviet, Kushnarenkovsky District, Bashkortostan, Russia. The population was 437 as of 2010. There are 12 streets.

Geography 
Mamyakovo is located 25 km southeast of Kushnarenkovo (the district's administrative centre) by road. Nizhneakbashevo is the nearest rural locality.

References 

Rural localities in Kushnarenkovsky District